Xiaoguang Yan (sometimes written as Xiaoguang Yan or Xiao Guang Yan,  – ) was a Chinese petrochemist who researched catalysts used in petroleum processing. He was born in Japan to Chinese parents. When he was young, he moved to the United States to study and work, earning a B.A. in chemistry from Pomona College in 1942 after transferring from Pasadena City College in 1940, and later a Ph.D. from the University of Chicago. He returned to China in 1951 after the establishment of the People's Republic of China. He became one of the pioneers of petrochemical research in the PRC, researching various catalysts for hydrocracking, hydroisomerization, and other petroleum processing techniques. He fell out of favor during the Cultural Revolution and committed suicide in 1968 along with his wife and daughter, but was posthumously rehabilitated in 1972.

Biography

Early life and US years
Xiao Guangyan was born in Tokyo Prefecture, Great Japanese Empire, September 15, 1920. His father was Xiao Quanxuan, a military attache at the Embassy of the Republic of China in Japan , and later served as minister in the Wang Jingwei regime. Xiao Guangyan studied at Shanghai Nanyang Model Middle and Primary School  from 1928 to 1937, and in February 1937 moved to the United States. Xiao Guangyan entered the Pasadena City College, completed high school in 1938, and completed the freshman and sophomore courses with honors in 1940; he entered the Chemistry Department of Pomona College in 1940, and graduated as a senior in 1942. In the fall of the same year, he became a graduate student in the Department of Chemistry at the University of Chicago, studying for a Ph.D. under James Franck. During this period, he served as a teaching assistant in organic chemistry, physical chemistry and advanced physical chemistry courses. He received a doctorate in physical chemistry in March 1946.

After graduation, Xiao Guangyan was employed as an assistant researcher in the Department of Chemistry at the University of Chicago from January 1946 to August 1946. From September 1946 to October 1950, he was a researcher at the Metallurgical Laboratory of the University of Chicago. During November, he worked in the basic research catalysis group of Mobil.

While in US Xiao Guangyan participated in the North American Chinese Student Christian Association and other student club activities. The club gatherings were often held at his home. Through these activities he was exposed to Marxism-Leninism and other ideas, and he was increasingly yearning for the newly established People's Republic of China. In addition, at that time Chinese overseas students discussed whether to return to China and participate in the construction of the new China. Xiao Guangyan was acquainted with some students who returned to China, who influenced him to take the same decision. The US immigration officials tried to retain Xiaoguang Yan, explaining that they would complete the formalities for him to live in US within two to three months, but he refused to stay.

Relocation to China
Therefore, in 1950 Xiao Guangyan traveled to China as a literature student at the University of Chicago (not as a PhD, so as not to be obstructed by the Immigration Bureau). He set off in November 1950 and boarded the President Wilson cruise in Los Angeles, USA, passing through Honolulu and Manila, in late December he arrived to Hong Kong, and to Beijing in March 1951.

Once in China, Xiao Guangyan was assigned to work in the Ministry of Petroleum Industry of the People's Republic of China. After living in Beijing for some time, Xiao Guangyan moved to Dalian and worked in the Dalian branch of the Northeast Institute of Science (Dalian Institute of Chemical Physics). After the outbreak of the Korean War, the Chinese society began to distrust of intellectuals who had returned from the United States; with the development of the ideological reform movement in 1951, and people started to reject Xiao Guangyan, and later questioned his motives for returning to China, and was criticized for talking about his previous life in the United States, and for "worshiping foreigners and wooing foreigners". Facing criticism, Xiaoguang Yan developed a strong sense of anger. Xiaoguang Yan was anxious, experiencing mood swings, some days he would miss work to protest, and on occasions took large doses of sleeping pills. After the ideological reform movement ended, Xiao Guangyan's life calmed down, and the leader of the institute apologized to him for his unfounded suspicion, and Xiao worked hard to resume work regardless  previous suspicions.

In early 1956, the Beijing Petroleum Refining Research Institute was established and Xiao Guangyan was invited to work here; he came to Beijing to experience the working environment for a while, and finally thought that Dalian had more basic research and the environment was more suitable for him, so he decided to refuse the invitation. While the practice of choosing a more ideal job is common in the United States, the Chinese society at that time pursued the idea of strictly obeying superiors, which made Xiao Guangyan once again been questioned. In 1957, Mao Zedong launched the "Da Ming Da Fang" Hundred Flowers Campaign (encouraging citizens to express openly their opinions of the communist regime), Xiaoguang Yan then submitted an article to the Communist Party branch secretary, criticizing the attitude of people to question their own thinking during the reform movement; but suddenly Da Ming Da Fang turned into an anti-rightist movement. Although some intellectuals who had previously expressed opinions were classified as rightists and punished,  Xiao Guangyan was not classified as rightists. In 1958, Xiao Guangyan's Catalytic Process Laboratory planned to move to Lanzhou, Gansu, but he asked to stay in Dalian, which has better scientific research conditions, and the request was approved by the research institute. However, this request violated the mainstream values of the Chinese society at that time.

In the Great Leap Forward period of "pulling out the white flags and planting the red ones in their stead" campaign, once again Xiaoguang Yan faced criticism. People questioned his motives for returning to China, work attitude, and living habits, and attacked him for being "demanding", "pampering with dignity", "greedy", "school lords", and "profiteer", big-character posters with these contents appeared everywhere. In the New Year, people performed live newspaper dramas that insulted Xiao Guangyan at the New Year's party, portraying him as a clown, and mocking his words and deeds. In this regard, Xiao Guangyan was extremely angry and became silent and distressed; he gradually lost himself after a long period of political criticism, and he did not dare to express his opinions directly as before. Later, people stopped criticizing scientific researchers, and the leaders of the institute apologized to Xiao Guangyan himself in 1961, and he resumed his work regardless of previous suspicions.

Persecution and suicide
During the movement to purify the class ranks during the Cultural Revolution, Xiao Guangyan was pinpointed as a "counter-revolutionary agent", and denounced and criticized through posters, and was forced to move to different neighbourhood. On October 5, 1968, Xiao Guangyan was ransacked by the Workers' Propaganda Team and imprisoned in a bullpen (a place where intellectuals were detained during the Cultural Revolution). He was desperate. The Workers Propaganda Team referred to Xiao Guangyan as a member of the secret service agency, and people joined in attacking Xiao Guangyan. He was interrogated with perseverance, using force methods such as punches, kicks, and torture to extract confessions, and was requested to continue to write confessions and expose his crimes. On the morning of December 11, 1968, Xiao Guangyan was found dead. The autopsy revealed that he committed suicide by taking barbital.

Personal life
Xiao Guangyan married Zhen Suhui in 1945. Zhen Suhui was born and raised in the United States and didn't speak Chinese. Her father used to be Sun Yat-sen's secretary. Later, he was sent by the Nationalist Government to work as an expatriate in the United States.

Zhen Suhui initially resisted Guanyan's plans for moving to China due to the language barrier and the political situation there. However, Xiao Guangyan had decided, and even proposed to go to China alone and let Zhen Suhui stay in the United States; she finally gave in and accompanied her husband to China. She served as English teacher at Dalian Maritime University. When Xiao Guangyan was troubled by political struggles, Zhen Suhui provided him understanding and comfort. The couple gave birth to their daughter in 1952, Xiao Luo Lin (nickname "Lolo").

During the Cultural Revolution, Zhen Suhui accepted to do labor work at Dalian Yingchengzi Farm, while Xiao Luolian was left alone at home. After Xiao Guangyan committed suicide, the work propaganda team called Zhen Suhui to Dahua Office to notify her of the death of her husband; she reacted calmly and asked the work propaganda team to give her two days off to take care of her daughter. On December 13, 1968, Zhen Suhui and Xiao Luolian took barbital together and died hugging each other in bed at home.

Rehabilitation 
After Xiao Guangyan's death, he was accused of being the central figure of the "301 Special Agent Group". His death triggered the "301" case, which was a major case and was later regarded as a model of "working class occupation of scientific research department". The work propaganda team described Xiao Guangyan's death as "the choice when class enemies are desperate" and "the great victory of the dictatorship of the proletariat ", and announced it as "extraordinarily good news" to inform all members of the Chinese Academy of Sciences, and classified him as a "counter-revolutionary agent".

Xiao Guangyan's former friend Bai Jiefu indicated that the prime minister Zhou Enlai personally asked to be informed about Xiao Guangyan's death and pursued those involved. In the end, two members of the work propaganda team (one was the leader and the other was the principal offender of the beating of Xiao Guangyan) were punished.

In August 1972, Xiao Guangyan's former friend and McGill University professor Lin Daguang visited China and was received by Zhou Enlai. During the period, he mentioned to Zhou Xiao's experience during the Cultural Revolution. Zhou Enlai said at the time that if it is found that Xiao Guangyan was indeed wronged, he should be rehabilitated. On September 9, 1972, the Party Committee of the Dalian Institute of Chemical Physics of the Chinese Academy of Sciences published the "Examination Conclusions on Xiao Guangyan's Historical Issues", denying the accusations against Xiao Guangyan of being a  "secret agent" during the Cultural Revolution, defining these accusations as false, and concluding that his return to China was out Yu's patriotic behavior, praised him for his love of the Communist Party of China and the socialist system, and affirmed that he made certain contributions to the country during his lifetime. On March 11, 1978, a memorial service for Xiao Guangyan was held in the auditorium of the Dalian Institute of Chemical Physics. The director of the institute said in his memorial speech: "Comrade Xiao Guangyan loves Chairman Mao, loves the Communist Party, and loves socialism. He has made contributions and is a talented person. The death of Comrade Xiao Guangyan was a major loss to the scientific research work of the Institute." Since then, Xiao Guangyan has been completely rehabilitated in the People's Republic of China.

Notes

References 

People from Fuzhou
University of Chicago alumni
Pomona College alumni
Chemical engineering academics
ExxonMobil people